Edith Hughes may refer to:

Edith Hughes (architect) (1888–1971), Scottish architect
Edith Hughes (As the World Turns), fictional character